HMS LST-410 was a United States Navy  that was transferred to the Royal Navy during World War II. As with many of her class, the ship was never named. Instead, she was referred to by her hull designation.

Construction
LST-410 was laid down on 13 September 1942, under Maritime Commission (MARCOM) contract, MC hull 930, by the Bethlehem-Fairfield Shipyard, Baltimore, Maryland; launched 15 November 1942; then transferred to the United Kingdom and commissioned on 14 January 1943.

Service history 
LST-410 served the Royal Navy during the invasion of Normandy. She then served as part of "W" Task Force where she served off the coast of Arakan, while participating in the Burma Campaign. LST-410 took part in Operation Dracula, the retaking of Rangoon, Operation Zipper, the retaking of Malaya, and Operation Tiderace, the retaking of Singapore. She then provided relief work repatriating ex-POWs of the Japanese after the war.

LST-410 saw no active service in the United States Navy. The tank landing ship was struck from the Navy list on 26 February 1946. She was returned to United States Navy custody and decommissioned on 16 March 1946. On 13 February 1948, LST-410 was sold to Bosey, Philippines, and subsequently scrapped.

See also 
 List of United States Navy LSTs

Notes 

Citations

Bibliography 

Online resources

External links

 

Ships built in Baltimore
1942 ships
LST-1-class tank landing ships of the Royal Navy
World War II amphibious warfare vessels of the United Kingdom
S3-M2-K2 ships